Tsumanska Puscha National Nature Park is a national park of Ukraine, located in the east of Volyn Oblast.

References

Volyn Oblast
National parks of Ukraine
Protected areas of Ukraine